Dust in the Sun is a 1958 Australian mystery film adapted from the 1955 novel Justin Bayard by Jon Cleary and produced by the team of Lee Robinson and Chips Rafferty. The film stars British actress
Jill Adams and an indigenous-Australian actor Robert Tudawali as Emu Foot.

Synopsis
Justin Bayard, a Northern Territory policeman, is escorting an aboriginal warrior, Emu Foot, to Alice Springs to be tried for a tribal killing. They are attacked by some Aborigines and forced to take refuge at an isolated cattle station. Julie, the bored wife of the station owner Tad Kirkbridge, sets Emu Foot free and is later murdered. Bayard romances stockman's daughter Chris. Emu Foot is killed by aboriginals and Bayard exposes Julie's murderer.

Cast
 Jill Adams as Julie Kirkbride
 Ken Wayne as Justin Bayard
 Maureen Lanagan as Chris Palady
 Robert Tudawali as Emu Foot
 James Forrest as Tad Kirkbride
 Jack Hume as Ned Palady
 Henry Murdoch as Spider
 Reg Lye as Dirks
 Alan Light as Inspector Prichett

Development
In May 1956 Robinson and Rafferty bought the film studios at Bondi which were once owned by Cinesound Productions. It was meant to be used as a basis for their television company, Australian Television Enterprises, but it was used for this film.

They optioned Jon Cleary's novel Justin Bayard. Robinson later recalled:
On that film we were aiming to do very well in the English market, because we had always done well there. For instance King of the Coral Sea earned much more than its production cost out of England whilst it earned its production cost in Australia. Walk into Paradise had also gone terribly well in England. England was a very strong market for us at that time. In fact it was probably a better market for us than the United States.

Casting
This was the fourth feature from Lee Robinson and Chips Rafferty but the first one in which Rafferty did not act, although he was originally meant to, with Charles Tingwell to play the second lead, a station manager.

According to Tingwell, Rafferty decided against playing the lead when Robinson wanted to increase the emphasis on the romantic subplot involving Bayard as he thought it was too old. Robinson then offered the lead to Tingwell, who claimed he was too short and wrong for the role, and he suggested Ken Wayne. Tingwell went on to act in The Shiralee (1957). Robinson was originally reluctant to work with Wayne and instead cast New Zealand actor Walter Brown. Brown had just appeared on stage in Teahouse of the Autumn Moon.

(At one stage American star John Ericson was sought to play the lead role.)

Jill Adams was imported from England to play the female lead. Robinson said he cast her on the basis of her performance in Doctor at Sea. She arrived in Sydney on 11 September 1956.

Maureen Lanagan was a Sydney model making her first film – Robinson also used models turned actors in The Phantom Stockman and King of the Coral Sea. (He often expressed frustration at what he saw was a lack of good looking young women who could act in Australia.)

This was Robert Tudawali's second film role after Jedda. His contract was negotiated by Southern International, Actors Equity and the Department of Native Affairs. In September 1956 he signed to play his role at £40 a week plus a bonus of £50 if the film was televised.

Production
Jill Adams flew out of Sydney on 13 September 1956 for seven weeks of filming near Alice Springs.

Shooting took place in the studio at Bondi and on location near Alice Springs in October and November 1956.

Three weeks into filming Robinson and Raffety decided to fire Brown because he seemed "too soft". They offered his role to Tingwell, who declined, and then cast Ken Wayne.

Release
The film premiered at the Sydney Film Festival in 1958 where the Bulletin called it "the worst film shown" at the festival with "a cheap, improbable story... crudely acted and edited, lapsing at times into absurd cliches."

It did not achieve a general release in Australia and England until 1960. It did not perform well at the box office.

According to Raffety's biographer "with television making serious inroads into movie attendances world wide and no Chips Rafferty to exploit for distribution, Dust in the Sun was just another badly made independent cheapie, and gathered its own dust on the shelf for some four years."

Lee Robinson later said, "I don't think it was a good script and I don't think that we had a very strong supporting cast and it was the first picture that we had done in which Chips didn't play the lead... I think our mistake there was to make a picture not geared for Chips."

Filmink later called the film "a kind-of Western that should have been more of a Western. It has a whiff of the white man's burden movie about it like Where No Vultures Fly – Wayne is a solid no nonsense public servant dealing with troublesome natives and snarly whites. It's a little bit progressive but not exactly PC – Tudawli's character has a chain around his neck for a lot of the film and is talked about as if he's a dog. Still, the location filming helps and Tudawali has charisma to burn."

The movie was the first job in the Australian industry for Jill Robb, who was Jill Adams' stand in and went on to become a leading producer.

References

Notes
Larkin, Bob Chips: The Life and Films of Chips Rafferty, MacMillan 1986

External links

Dust in the Sun at National Film and Sound Archive
Dust in the Sun at Oz Movies

1958 films
Australian mystery films
Films based on works by Jon Cleary
1958 adventure films
Films directed by Lee Robinson
Films set in the Northern Territory
1950s English-language films